Thomso is the annual cultural fest of Indian Institute of Technology, Roorkee. Established in 1982, the festival is held over a span of three days at the end of October and the beginning of November. The 2018 edition consisted of over 150+ events and hosted 9000+ guest students from 200 colleges across India, in addition to more than 12,000 students from the hosting institution.

History 

The festival is named after its founder, Sir James Thomason, lieutenant governor 1843–53, the founder of the Thomason College of Civil Engineering in 1853, which later became the University of Roorkee in 1948, and, IIT Roorkee in 2001.

Pronites and Concerts

Pronites and concerts feature artists from all over the world wherein Wargasm, an event that gives a stage to hound and amateur bands to perform with professional heading bands, in front of a massive audience had Astitva band in 2017, Nikhil d Souza coke studio in 2016. Dj NYK, who was awarded VH1s MyFav Award for India's #1 Bollywood Dj twice, Benea reach( Grammy award nominee), prestorica, and Indian Ocean also performed. Young bands such as pentagram, moksha, mother Jane, Parikrama have all been a part of Wargasm.

Thahake, also called Hasya Kavi Sammelan is the key to happiness for our audience. It has played host to comedians like Rajiv Nigam, Pratap faujdar, Kumar Vishwas and Surendra Sharma in 2013, Hindi poets like Dinesh Raghuwanshi, Yusuf Bharadwaj, Mahender Ajnabi, Mahender Sharma and Preeti Vishwas in 2014 and Azeem in 2016. Also, the crowd was enthralled with the witty one-liners and comebacks of Deepak Saini.

Xhileration wherein Famous bands Euphoria, Jal, the legendary ghazal singer Pankaj Udaas in 2013, Krishna Kumar Kunnath popularly known as KK, along with his band, KK live set foot in the land of white beauty in 2014, Sunidhi Chauhan and Saar band in 2016.

Thomso participants also had the opportunity to witness the EDM concert wherein Marnik, the Italian progressive house duo formed by Alessandro Martello and Emanuele Longo had put the stage on fire.

Enthusiasm rained and fervour thundered as Thomso reached its zenith with Farhan Akhtar taking over the stage. Adrenaline rushed down every spine when he performed his heart-throbbing tracks before the vibrant spectators. His high-octane performance was a perfect valediction to the days of The Magical Fantasia.

Deep into music and High on energy - Nucleya made bass go boom and beats go loud as he played the full stadium with invigorating enthusiasm and energy. The sizzling Vogue couldn't have asked for a better follow-up than this dynamic EDM concert. With confetti bursts, gas cannons and massive video walls, the pronite was a spectacle for the onlookers.

Thomso’19~ A gleaming gala, as never before cradled in its own mesmerising and zestful aura. A multitude of top-notch artistry in presence of mesmerising shows by professionals of national and international standards unwrapped the charm within you and let the waves of light take you to its abode. Inaugurated by the Padma Shri Smt. Shovana Narayan, graced by Mr Ajit Chaturvedi, Director of IITR and other diagnitaries from the institute.

The pronites flagged off with melodious musicale entertainment from the sensational Jubin Nautiyal who turned the most sombre of the moods swinging into a melodious musicale. From the moment he took the stage, the crowd got immersed in a wave of ecstasy never seen before. Also later in an article, he mentioned his experience at Thomso quoting it as the most memorable live performance he did which later went on to make history as the most-viewed live performance on YouTube in Asia.

The very famous duo of Salim and Sulaiman enthralled every single heart of the crowd that their voice and music have visited. Thomsonian's got the opportunity to witness the charm of the pair as they sang away their best album songs.

Among so many chartbuster DJs like Dj Dual Vibes( Dj Aceaxe and Akshay Dhawan)and rappers, Naezy made the ground roar with every beat of his iconic performance.

Events

 
Various events take place in the institution to encourage the students to enhance their knowledge, do something innovative and have loads of fun. A change from their daily routine of classes, assignments, tests and labs is a must. The various societies also conduct events around the year, to promote their culture.

Vogue 2019, catered to the fashionistas was a breath stopper where sculpted males and gorgeous females sizzled the ramp with the display of their sensational apparel, radiating confidence and mystique. It was graced by none other than Devika Vaid, Miss India Earth 2018. Fashion vogue, Campus Diva always proved to be an even extravaganza than the buzz around it.

Asia's got talent semi-finalist and winner of MTV Nescafé labs, flute-boxer Sudhir R. made a sumptuous performance at Thomso’19 which left the entire crowd enchanted.

Thomso also collaborated with the Portugal Embassy in India and invited Portuguese saxophone artist Tiago Tabitha, who has mesmerised the world with his jazz music on his pet saxophone. In collaboration with the Embassy of Switzerland in India, Thomso invited the Swiss artist Daniel Garbade to show his works at its Fine Arts Section.

YouTube stars, Shivankit and Jassi single-handedly made the audience laugh out all.

Footloose wherein 5 exhaustive types of (solo, duet, Group) dance competitions based on western and classical themes are held, the gala saw exceptional talents owning the dance floor with their impeccable moves and styles

Battle of bands: “Music washes away from the soul, the dust of everyday life” - aptly captures the spirit of the musicians who will perform at Battle of the Bands. The event makes way for individual artists as well as bands who have a story to tell with their music. The hardcore music rivalry of Thomso’19 saw real bands perform live, contending to win the hearts of the audience.

Mr- Ms Thomso where participants need to show different aspects of their personality going through questionnaire sessions, interviews and much more. After much grilling and rapid-fire questions, the winners are crowned.

Apocalypse is the gaming competition with games: CS GO, DOTA, FIFA, NFS Most Wanted; the face-off that pitched elite games against each other in live gaming matches in a clash for the ultimate glory.

Carnivals are the most awaited events of Thomso, as it exhilarates the fanatics with ecstasy and euphoria. With Events ranging from Paintball to Body Zorbing, Human Foosball to Bungee Basket, magic shows to boulevard games; tattoo and caricature artists; it had it all. In 3 days, Thomso covers every topic under the sun from dance to literature, music to technology, fashion to finance, fine arts to cyber gaming, cinema to showbiz and whatnot. The majestic grandeur of this three-day cultural extravaganza unlocks a spectrum full of infinite possibilities for the creative folks and talented personnel. The winners of all these competitions are offered prizes worth Rs. 30 Lakhs!

If the days are ecstatic, then the nights are charismatic. Nightlife cafe is always full of fun and amusement with events like karaoke, spin the wheel, musical chairs and Antakshari. Partying all night in Silent DJs with headphones on is an experience worth everyone's remembrance.

Social initiatives by Thomso

While Thomso aims at bringing joy out of people, it has always been socially active. With Thomso getting more light every year, it hopes to host socially helpful events such as art exhibitions for the underprivileged by exhibiting the art born out from these sectors.

During the period of Thomso’13, with the association of the National Service Scheme(NSS) and Anushruti, the social initiatives involved children's education, clothing and food for the needy family, plantations and blood donation camps on the campus and various other places. By taking the need to conserve energy Thomso’13 also lend its hands to this concept by taking initiatives required for energy saving seeding it from the IITR campus.

References 

Culfests
IIT Roorkee
Indian Institutes of Technology festivals
1982 establishments in Uttar Pradesh